The Jamaica women's national basketball team is governed by the Jamaica Basketball Association.

See also
 Jamaica women's national under-19 basketball team
 Jamaica women's national under-17 basketball team
 Jamaica women's national 3x3 team

References

External links
Official website 
Presentation at CaribbeanBasketball.com
FIBA Profile
Latinbasket.com - Jamaica Women National Team
Archived records of Jamaica team participations

Women's national basketball teams
Basketball in Jamaica
Basketball teams in Jamaica
Basketball